Muhammad Shaban (born 11 January 1998) is a Ugandan international footballer who plays for Onduparaka, as a striker.

Club career
Born in Arua, Shaban signed a contract with Vipers in 2015, but it was rendered void and he signed for Onduparaka instead. He signed a three-year contract with Kampala Capital City Authority in October 2017, scoring on his debut a month later. In August 2018 he was linked with transfer to South African club Orlando Pirates and Moroccan club Raja Casablanca. He signed for Raja Casablanca for the 2018–19 season, making 5 league appearances, before returning to Vipers in August 2019.

International career
He made his international debut in 2016, and was named in the squad for the 2017 Africa Cup of Nations.

Honours
2016 FUFA Footballer of the Year

References

1998 births
Living people
Ugandan footballers
Uganda international footballers
Vipers SC players
Onduparaka FC players
Kampala Capital City Authority FC players
Raja CA players
Association football forwards
Ugandan expatriate footballers
Ugandan expatriate sportspeople in Morocco
Expatriate footballers in Morocco
2017 Africa Cup of Nations players
Botola players
Uganda A' international footballers
2018 African Nations Championship players
2020 African Nations Championship players